Private law is that part of a civil law legal system which is part of the jus commune that involves relationships between individuals, such as the law of contracts and torts (as it is called in the common law), and the law of obligations (as it is called in civil legal systems). It is to be distinguished from public law, which deals with relationships between both natural and artificial persons (i.e., organizations) and the state, including regulatory statutes, penal law and other law that affects the public order. In general terms, private law involves interactions between private individuals, whereas public law involves interrelations between the state and the general population.

Concept 
One of the five capital lawyers in Roman law, Domitius Ulpianus, (170–223) – who differentiated ius publicum versus ius privatum – the European, more exactly the continental law, philosophers and thinkers want(ed) to put each branch of law into this dichotomy: Public and Private Law. "huius studdii duæ sunt positiones: publicum et privatum. Publicum ius est, quod statum rei Romanæ spectat, privatum, quod ad singulorum utilitatem; sunt enim quædam publice utila, quædam privatim". (Public law is that, which concerns Roman state, private law is concerned with the interests of citizens.) In the modern era Charles-Louis Montesquieu (1689–1755) amplified supremely this distinction: International (law of nations), Public (politic law) and Private (civil law) Law, in his major work: (On) The Spirit of the Law (1748). "Considered as inhabitants of so great a planet, which necessarily contains a variety of nations, they have laws relating to their mutual intercourse, which is what we call the law of nations. As members of a society that must be properly supported, they have laws relating to the governors and the governed, and this we distinguish by the name of politic law. They have also another sort of law, as they stand in relation to each other; by which is understood the civil law."

Private law in common law jurisdictions
The concept of private law in common law countries is a little broader, in that it also encompasses private relationships between governments and private individuals or other entities. That is, relationships between governments and individuals based on the law of contract or torts are governed by private law, and are not considered to be within the scope of public law.

Areas of private law 
Agricultural law
Business law
Company law
Commercial law
Civil law
Law of obligations
Contract law
Tort law
Law of unjust enrichment and quasi-contracts
Trust law
Law of agency
Property law
Family law - family-related issues and domestic relations including marriage, civil unions, divorce, spousal abuse, child custody and visitation, property, alimony, and child support awards, child abuse issues, and adoption.
Succession - estate planning, testate and intestate succession, probate, and law of wills
Consumer protection
International private law
Labour law
Transport law

See also 
 International Institute for the Unification of Private Law
 International Journal of Private Law
Polycentric law
 Private law society
 Social law

References